Thiago Alves may refer to:

Thiago Alves (tennis) (born 1982), Brazilian tennis player
Thiago Alves (fighter) (born 1983), Brazilian mixed martial artist
Thiago Soares Alves (born 1986), Brazilian volleyball player

See also
Tiago Alves (disambiguation)